Gastón Pauls (born January 17, 1972) is an Argentine actor, TV host and producer.

Biography

Born in Buenos Aires, Argentina, Pauls comes from a family of artists. His mother was a painter, his father a film producer, and his paternal grandparents dancers.

Career

Pauls started his career on television as a host of a videoclip show before starring in the teen soap opera Montaña Rusa. He then starred on Verdad Consecuencia, one of Adrián Suar's first TV hits on Canal 13. Pauls participated in productions of Alejandro Doria and in the novels Alas, poder y pasión, Mamitas. In theater he did Desde la lona, Porteños, La gata sobre el tejado de zinc. In cinema his first was Territorio comanche alongside Imanol Arias and Cecilia Dopazo. But it was his participation in the memorable Nine Queens by Fabián Bielinsky alongside Ricardo Darín and Leticia Brédice that gave him international recognition and the award for best actor in Biarritz. Then in 2003 he decided to return to television in the scripted Tres padres solteros and the show Ser Urbano a mix of fiction, journalism, and factual documentary broadcast until 2006 by Telefe. In 2005 Pauls founded with Alejandro Suaya a production company called Rosstoc S.A., in which he surrounded himself with a dynamic team of quality professionals and with which he created programs such as "Mejor hablar de ciertas cosas", "Todos contra Juan" and "Ciega a citas". The production company would declare bankruptcy in 2010. In 2008 Pauls both acted in and produced Todos contra Juan. Actor Steve Carell guested in the final episode. He made fiction documentary about the media called "Miedos de Comunicación". In 2015 he made a film about the life of Padre Carlos Mugica, he wrote the screenplay with Mariano Starosta. Currently he hosts every Monday from 21 to 23 "Mi Otro Yo" on the radio del Plata AM 1030.

Personal life

Gastón met Nancy Dupláa in the teen soap opera Montaña Rusa whom he dated for two years. From 2007 to 2014, Pauls was in a relationship with fellow Argentine actress Agustina Cherri, with whom he had two children, daughter Muna (2009) and son Nilo (2011). He is a vegetarian.

Television

Movies

TV programs

Productions

Footnotes

External links
 

1972 births
Argentine people of German descent
Argentine male film actors
Argentine male television actors
Living people
Male actors from Buenos Aires